
Gmina Olszanka is a rural gmina (administrative district) in Łosice County, Masovian Voivodeship, in east-central Poland. Its seat is the village of Olszanka, which lies approximately 8 kilometres (5 mi) south-west of Łosice and 113 km (70 mi) east of Warsaw.

Villages
Gmina Olszanka contains the villages and settlements of Bejdy, Bolesty, Dawidy, Hadynów, Klimy, Korczówka, Korczówka-Kolonia, Mszanna, Nowe Łepki, Olszanka, Pietrusy, Próchenki, Radlnia, Stare Łepki, Szawły, Szydłówka and Wyczółki.

Neighbouring gminas
Gmina Olszanka is bordered by the gminas of Huszlew, Łosice, Międzyrzec Podlaski, Mordy and Zbuczyn.

References

Polish official population figures 2006

Olszanka
Gmina Olszanka